Măgurele is a town situated in the southwestern part of Ilfov County, Muntenia, Romania. It has a population of 11,000 and hosts several research institutes.

Research institutes
Although a small town, Magurele hosts 9 different research institutes, on the naukograd model:
Horia Hulubei National Institute for R&D in Physics and Nuclear Engineering (NIPNE/IFIN-HH) nipne.ro
Extreme Light Infrastructure - Nuclear Physics (ELI-NP) www.eli-np.ro
National Institute for Laser, Plasma and Radiation Physics (INFLPR) inflpr.ro
National Institute of Materials Physics (NIMP) infim.ro
Institute of Atomic Physics (IFA) ifa-mg.ro
National Institute of R&D for Optoelectronics (INOE 2000) inoe.ro
National Institute for Earth Physics (NIEP/INCDFP) infp.ro
National Institute of Research and Development in Mechatronics and Measurement Technique (INCDMTM) incdmtm.ro
National Research&Development Institute for Non-ferrous and Rare Metals (IMNR) imnr.ro
Research and Development National Institute for Metals and Radioactive Resources (INCDMRR-ICPMRR) incdmrr.ro

Between 1957 and 1998, it had a Soviet VVRS research reactor, now closed down. The Faculty of Physics of the University of Bucharest is also located in Măgurele.

According to a Romanian government press release, the high power laser system (HPLS) project of the Extreme Light Infrastructure — Nuclear Physics Center achieved the power of 10 petawatts on 7 March 2019, becoming the most powerful laser in the world.

Administration

Măgurele was declared a town in 2004. It has a population of over 11,000. Four villages are administered by the town: Alunișu, Dumitrana, Pruni, and Vârteju.

Etymology
Its name is derived from a Romanian word possibly of Dacian origin, măgură, meaning "hill".

Natives
 George Anania
 Augustin Deleanu

References

External links

Horia Hulubei National Institute of Physics and Nuclear Engineering
National Institute of Materials Physics

Towns in Romania
Populated places in Ilfov County
Localities in Muntenia